This is a list of notable editorial cartoonists of the past and present sorted by nationality. An editorial cartoonist is an artist, a cartoonist who draws editorial cartoons that contain some level of political or social commentary. The list is incomplete; it lists only those editorial cartoonists for whom a Wikipedia article already exists.

International
Patrick Chappatte, International New York Times
Kal, The Economist

Algeria
Ali Dilem

Argentina
Miguel Brascó

Australia

 Dean Alston
 Patrick Cook
 Stan Cross
 John Ditchburn
 Christopher Downes, Hobart Mercury, Christopher Downes’ Cartoons
 William Ellis Green
 Arthur Horner
 Geoff "Jeff" Hook
 Mark Knight
 Bill Leak
 Michael Leunig
 Stewart McCrae
 Malcolm McGookin
 Alan Moir
 George Molnar
 Peter Nicholson
 Pat Oliphant
 Ward O'Neill
 Bruce Petty
 Larry Pickering
 Geoff Pryor
 Paul Rigby, News Corporation
 David Rowe The Australian Financial Review
 Dan Russell
 Jim Russell
 John Spooner
 Cathy Wilcox
 Paul Zanetti

Bangladesh
Arifur Rahman, Toons Mag
Khalil Rahman, The Daily Jugantor

Belgium
 Didier Dubucq
 Gal
 Philippe Geluck
 Kamagurka
 Karl Meersman
 Jef Nys
 Félicien Rops
 Marc Sleen

Brazil
 Carlos Latuff
 Manuel de Araújo Porto-Alegre (19th century)
 Zero

Canada

 Aislin (Terry Mosher), The Montreal Gazette
 Bado (Guy Badeaux)
 Sid Barron
 John Wilson Bengough
 Blaine (Blaine MacDonald)
 Stewart Cameron
 Roy Carless
 Bob Chambers
 Serge Chapleau
 Fred Curatolo
 Michael de Adder, Halifax Daily News
 Andy Donato, Toronto Sun
 Brian Gable
 Graeme MacKay, Mackay Cartoons
 Bruce MacKinnon
 Duncan Macpherson
 Len Norris
 Roy Peterson
 André Pijet
 Adrian Raeside
 Vic Roschkov, Sr.
 Wyatt Tremblay
 Kerry Waghorn
 Avrom Yanovsky

China
 Wuheqilin (Fu Yu 付昱)

Colombia
 Vladdo (Vladimir Flórez)

Denmark
 Roald Als
 Per Marquard Otzen

Egypt
Mustafa Hussein
Ahmed Toughan

France

Diego Aranega
Jean-François Batellier
Cabu
Honoré Daumier
André Gill
Robert Lassalvy
Étienne Lécroart
Luz
Chantal Montellier
Amédée de Noé, aka Cham
René Pétillon
Françoise Pichard
Plantu
Jean-Marc Reiser
Riss
Siné
Charles-Joseph Traviès de Villers (born in Switzerland)

Finland
 Kari Suomalainen, Helsingin Sanomat

Greece
 Chrysanthos Mentis Bostantzoglou (also known as Bost; Greek: Μποστ)
Andreas Petroulakis

India

 Sudhir Dar
 Shekhar Gurera
 Kutty
 R. K. Laxman
 Manjul
 Shankar Pamarthy
 Vasant Sarwate
 Sudhir Tailang
 Bal Thackeray
 Tulal
 E. P. Unni
 Mir Suhail Qadri
 Ashok Adepal

Iran
Bozorgmehr Hosseinpour
Nikahang Kowsar
Mana Neyestani
Maziar Bijani

Ireland

 Arthur Booth
 Gordon Brewster
 W. H. Conn
 John Doyle ("H.B.")
 Thomas Fitzpatrick
 Rowel Friers
 Harry Furniss
 Grace Gifford
 Charles E. Kelly
 Ian Knox
 J. D. Reigh
 Martyn Turner

Israel

Gideon Amichay
 "Dosh" (Kariel Gardosh)
Dudu Geva
Avi Katz
Michel Kichka
Ranan Lurie
Ze'ev

Italy
 Alex Di Gregorio
 Emanuele Del Rosso

Japan
 Susumu Matsushita

Jordan
 Khaldoon Gharaibeh

Lebanon
 Mahmoud Kahil, Asharq Al-Awsat, Al Majalla, Courrier International

Lithuania
 Rytis Daukantas

Malaysia
 Lat

Mexico
 Paco Calderón
 Antonio Helguera

Morocco
 Abdellah Derkaoui

Nepal
 Rabi Mishra

Netherlands
 Johan Braakensiek
 Bastiaan Geleijnse
 Albert Hahn
 Gregorius Nekschot
 Louis Raemaekers
 John Reid
 Peter van Straaten
 Jean-Marc van Tol
 Willem

New Zealand

 Jeff Bell, The Dominion Post, Waikato Times, Stuff, Stuff Jeff Bell Cartoons
 William Blomfield
 Guy Body, The NZ Herald, Guy Body’s Website 
 Bob Brockie, National Business Review
 Peter Bromhead, Marlborough Express
 Emma Cook, The Dominion Post, Waikato Times, Sunday Star Times, Stuff Website, Emma Cook’s cartoons Anthony Ellison
 Rod Emmerson, The NZ Herald , Rod Emmerson’s Cartoons  
 Malcolm Evans
 Allan Hawkey, Waikato Times Eric Heath
 Trace Hodgson, Listener , NZ Truth, New Zealand herald, Trace Hodgson’s Cartoons
 Jim Hubbard, The Dominion Post, Waikato Times, Jim Hubbard’s Cartoons
 John Kent -  (Varoomshka)
 Sharon Murdoch, Sunday Star Times, The Press, Dominion Post
 Gordon Minhinnick, New Zealand Herald
 Sid Scales, Otago Daily Times
 Tom Scott, The Dominion Post
 Chris Slane, Chris Slane’s Cartoons
 Garrick Tremain

Norway
Morten Mørland, The Times
Arifur Rahman

Pakistan
 Yusuf Lodhi
 Saadia Gardezi

Palestine
 Naji al-Ali
 Mohammad Saba'aneh
 Emad Hajjaj

Poland
Zbigniew Lengren

Portugal
 Bordalo Pinheiro, Rafael, Zé Povinho

Romania
 Gogu Neagoe

Russia
 Boris Efimov

Saudi Arabia
Hana Hajjar, Arab News

Serbia
 Dušan Petričić
 Predrag Koraksić Corax

Singapore
Heng Kim Song

South Africa
 Jeremy Nell
 Zapiro

South Korea
 Kim Sung Whan

Spain

 Kap, La Vanguardia, El Mundo Deportivo
 Antonio Lara de Gavilán
 Mingote, ABC

Switzerland
Patrick Chappatte

Tunisia
Z

Turkey
 Cem Kızıltuğ, Zaman
 Salih Memecan, Sabah
 Emre Ozdemir, Zaman

United Kingdom

 Ewen Bain, Daily Record, Scots Independent
 Steve Bell, The Guardian
 Rupert Besley, Isle of Wight County Press
 Peter Brookes, The Times
 Peter Clark, The Guardian
 Charles Exeter Devereux Crombie
 Michael Cummings, Daily Express
 Stanley Arthur Franklin, Daily Mirror and The Sun
 Nicholas Garland, Daily Telegraph
 Les Gibbard
 Carl Giles
 William Hogarth, 18th century
 Richard Horne
 Jak, Evening Standard
 Mahmoud Kahil, Asharq Al-Awsat, Al Majalla, Courrier International
 David Low
 Malcolm McGookin
 Lorna Miller, The Guardian, Bella Caledonia, Private Eye, The Morning Star,  Lorna Miller’s Cartoons
 William Papas, The Guardian
 Jonathan Pugh, The Times and The Daily Mail
 Chris Riddell, The Observer
 John Tenniel
 Edward Tennyson Reed, Punch (19th and 20th Century)
 Martin Rowson, The Guardian
 Gerald Scarfe, The Sunday Times and The New Yorker
 Peter Schrank
 Clive Uptton 
 Victor Vicky Weisz
 Dyke White, Daily Record and The Scottish Daily Express
 Philip Zec, Daily Mirror

United States

 Lalo Alcaraz, LA Weekly
 F.O. Alexander, Philadelphia Bulletin
 Nick Anderson, Houston Chronicle
 Chuck Asay, Creators Syndicate
 Tony Auth, Philadelphia Inquirer
 Pat Bagley, Salt Lake Tribune
 Clifford H. Baldowski
 Cornelia Barns
 Darrin Bell
 Khalil Bendib
 Clay Bennett, Chattanooga Times Free Press
 Steve Benson, Arizona Republic
 Oscar Berger
 Randy Bish, Pittsburgh Tribune-Review
 Chip Bok, Akron Beacon Journal
 Ruben Bolling, Tom the Dancing Bug
 Jim Borgman, Cincinnati Enquirer
 Matt Bors, United Media, United Features Syndicate
 Luther D. Bradley, Chicago Daily News
 Steve Breen, San Diego Union-Tribune
 Steve Brodner
 Jacob Burck, Chicago Sun-Times
 Daryl Cagle, Cagle Cartoons
 Stuart Carlson, Milwaukee Journal Sentinel
 William Charles (1776–1820)
 Earle D. Chesney
 Ron Cobb, Los Angeles Free Press
 Paul Conrad, Tribune Media Services
 Bill Crawford, United Media, NEA
 Stacy Curtis
 Jeff Danziger, Los Angeles Times Syndicate
 Jay Norwood Darling, Des Moines Register
 Bill Day, Cagle Cartoons
 Sean Delonas, New York Post
 Liza Donnelly, The New Yorker Magazine
 Robert W. Edgren, The Evening World
 Bob Englehart, The Hartford Courant
 Charles Evenden
 Jules Feiffer
 Charles Fincher, LawComix
 Mark Fiore
 Daniel R. Fitzpatrick, St. Louis Post Dispatch (two-time Pulitzer prize)
 Mike Flugennock
 Joe Fournier, Chicago Tribune
 Michael Fry, Houston Post
 Ben Garrison
 Thomas F. Gibson
 John "DOK" Hager, Seattle Times
 Walt Handelsman, New Orleans Advocate & Tribune Content Agency
 Harold R. Heaton
 Joe Heller, Green Bay Press-Gazette
 Herblock, The Washington Post
 Dick Hodgins, Jr.
 Jerry Holbert, Boston Herald
 Ed Holland, Chicago Tribune
 David Horsey, Tribune Content Agency
 Karl Hubenthal, Los Angeles Hearst newspapers
 Etta Hulme, Fort Worth Star-Telegram
 Barry Hunau,  J. The Jewish News of Northern California
 Frank Interlandi, Des Moines Register, Los Angeles Times
 Cecil Jensen
 Kerry G. Johnson
 Clay Jones, The Free Lance-Star
 Kevin Kallaugher, The Economist, Baltimore Sun
 Steve Kelley, Times-Picayune
 Kelly, The Onion
 Warren King 
 Keith Knight, The K Chronicles, (Th)ink
 Jeff Koterba, Omaha World Herald
 Lyle Lahey
 Mike Lester, Rome News-Tribune
 Mike Luckovich, Atlanta Journal-Constitution
 Ranan Lurie
 Miel Prudencio Ma
 Jeff MacNelly, Chicago Tribune
 Reg Manning, Arizona Republic
 Jimmy Margulies, The Record (Bergen County)
 Doug Marlette, Tulsa World
 Marguerite Martyn, St. Louis Post-Dispatch
 Bill Mauldin, St. Louis Post-Dispatch
 Glenn McCoy, Belleville News-Democrat
 John Tinney McCutcheon, Chicago Tribune
 Shaw McCutcheon, Spokesman-Review
 Wiley Miller
 Jim Morin, Miami Herald
 Thomas Nast
 Neal Obermeyer, San Diego Reader, Lincoln Journal Star, The Reader
 Jack Ohman, The Sacramento Bee
 Pat Oliphant, Universal Press Syndicate
 Carey Orr, Chicago Tribune
 Ray Osrin, The Plain Dealer
 Paul Palnik
 Jeff Parker, Florida Today
 Walt Partymiller
 Mike Peters, Dayton Daily News
 Andreas Petroulakis
 Joel Pett, Lexington Herald-Leader & Tribune Content Agency
 John Pierotti
 Ted Rall, Universal Press Syndicate
 Michael Ramirez, Investor's Business Daily
 Mikhaela Reid
 Steve Sack, Minneapolis Star Tribune
 Ben Sargent, Austin American-Statesman
 Bill Schorr, United Media, United Features Syndicate
 Dr. Seuss (Theodor Seuss Geisel)
 Drew Sheneman, Tribune Content Agency
 Jen Sorensen 
 Lee W. Stanley
 Scott Stantis, Chicago Tribune & Tribune Content Agency
 Wayne Stayskal, Tampa Tribune
 Ed Stein, Rocky Mountain News
 Ed Subitzky, New York Times
 Dana Summers, Tribune Content Agency
 Ann Telnaes, NYTS/CWS
 Tom Toles, Washington Post
 Tom Tomorrow (Dan Perkins), This Modern World
 Rob Tornoe
 J. P. Trostle, Herald-Sun (Durham, North Carolina)
 Unit (Cristian Fleming), The Brooklyn Paper
 Edmund S. Valtman, The Hartford Times
 Gary Varvel, Indianapolis Star
 Pete Wagner, (Minneapolis) City Pages, Minnesota Daily, Madison Press Connection, Hustler Magazine
 Dan Wasserman, Boston Globe & Tribune Content Agency
 Emil Weiss
 Shan Wells, Huffington Post, Artizans, Cartoon Movement, Durango Telegraph
 Charles Werner, Indianapolis Star
 Signe Wilkinson, Philadelphia Daily News
 Clint C. Wilson, Sr.
 Monte Wolverton, Cagle Cartoons
 Don Wright, Palm Beach Post
 Larry Wright, Detroit News
 Matt Wuerker, Politico
 Adam Zyglis, Buffalo News

See also
 Editorial cartoon
 Editorial cartoonist

References

 
Editorial cartoonists
Cartooning-related lists